Paul Michael Kelly (August 9, 1899 – November 6, 1956) was an American stage, film, and television actor. His career survived a manslaughter conviction, tied to an affair, that caused him to spend time in prison in the late 1920s.

Early life
Paul Michael Kelly was  born in Brooklyn, New York, to a Roman Catholic family of Irish descent, the ninth of 10 children. His father owned a saloon, Kelly's Kafe, in the shadow of Vitagraph Studios, on E. 14th St. in Midwood, Brooklyn. After his father's death, he began his career as a child actor at age seven and was appearing on the stage. In 1911, at age 12, Kelly began making silent films with Vitagraph Studios, where he was billed as Master Paul Kelly. Kelly was possibly the first male child actor to be given any starring roles in American films, antedating better-remembered child stars such as Bobby Connelly and Jackie Coogan.

Career
Kelly alternated between stage and screen as an actor. He was a handsome and popular male lead or costar in Broadway plays from the late 1910s and throughout the 1920s.  Kelly made his talking film debut in 1933's Broadway Through a Keyhole. In the course of his career, and relatively short life, it has been estimated that Kelly worked on stage, screen, and television in over four hundred roles. Later in his film career, as an adult, Kelly appeared in films mostly as a character actor playing tough guys – some sympathetic, some not – during the 1930s, 1940s and 1950s. 

In 1948, Kelly won a Best Actor Tony Award for his role in Command Decision. Clark Gable later played the same role in the film version of the play. Kelly shared the award with Henry Fonda for Mister Roberts and Basil Rathbone for The Heiress.

Manslaughter conviction
On April 16, 1927, a drunk Kelly confronted fellow actor Ray Raymond over his affair with and love for Raymond's wife, actress Dorothy Mackaye. Raymond, who was also drunk, was no match for Kelly, who was considerably larger than him. During their confrontation, Kelly hit him several times and left him on the floor.  
  
Mackaye denied claims in court that she had been romantically involved with Kelly before Raymond's death, but Kelly's love letters to her were introduced as evidence. She was charged with felony conspiracy for the attempted coverup, and sentenced to one to three years, but served less than 10 months. Kelly was sentenced to up to 10 years, but served only 25 months in San Quentin prison. Conditions of his release included that he must not marry for 18 months after his release, and that he would have to take a job as a clerk for $30 per week. Kelly found working as a clerk untenable, and convinced the supervisors of his parole to allow him to return to acting on Broadway, with the condition that he continued to be limited to an income of $30 per week.

Years later, Kelly played the part of San Quentin Warden Clinton Duffy in Duffy of San Quentin.

Personal life 
Kelly and Mackaye married in 1931, shortly after the expiration on Kelly's parole condition prohibiting him from marrying. They performed on Broadway, and then returned to California, where Mackaye's daughter Valerie Raymond was apparently adopted by Kelly and became known as Mimi Kelly. Mimi would later have her own modest Broadway career.

Dorothy Mackaye's account of her experiences, Women in Prison, became a film, Ladies They Talk About (1933), with Barbara Stanwyck, and was remade as Lady Gangster in 1942. 

Mackaye died from a 1940 auto crash, when her car swerved and rolled into a ditch. She walked home, and, seeking to assuage Kelly's concerns, insisted that she was not seriously hurt. However, she had suffered internal injuries, and died within hours. In 1941, Kelly married Claire Owen (born Zona Mardelle Zwicker), a bit player he had met on the set of Flight Command (1940). She retired from acting, and went on to survive him. 

Kelly died of a heart attack at 57 on November 6, 1956, in Beverly Hills, California.

Filmography

References

Bibliography 
 John Holmstrom, The Moving Picture Boy: An International Encyclopaedia from 1895 to 1995, Norwich, Michael Russell, 1996, pp. 13–14.

External links

 
 
 

1899 births
1956 deaths
American male film actors
American male silent film actors
American male stage actors
American male television actors
American male child actors
American people convicted of manslaughter
Burials at Holy Cross Cemetery, Culver City
Donaldson Award winners
Male actors from New York City
20th-century American male actors
People from Brooklyn
Tony Award winners